The 1979 WFA Cup Final was the 10th final of the FA Women's Cup, England's primary cup competition for women's football teams. It was the fifth final to be held under the direct control of Women's Football Association (FA).

Match

Summary

The match ended 1-0 in favour of Southampton.

References

External links
 
 Report at WomensFACup.co.uk

Cup
Women's FA Cup finals
May 1979 sports events in the United Kingdom